Fayard (complete name: Librairie Arthème Fayard) is a French Paris-based publishing house established in 1857. Fayard is controlled by Hachette Livre.

In 1999, Éditions Pauvert became part of Fayard. Claude Durand was director of Fayard from 1980 until his retirement in 2009. He was replaced by Olivier Nora, previously head of Éditions Grasset & Fasquelle another division of the Hachette group.
On 6 November 2013, Nora was replaced by Sophie de Closets, who officially took over at the beginning of 2014.

In December 2009, Hachette Littérature (publisher of the Pluriel pocket collection) was absorbed by Fayard. Isabelle Seguin, the director of Hachette Littérature, became literary director of Fayard.

Imprints
Fayard has three imprints:
 Editions Mille et Une Nuits
 Editions Mazarine
 Pauvert

Works published
Works published by Editions Fayard include:
Dictionnaire de la France médiévale by French historian Jean Favier
 Les Égarés by French writer Frederick Tristan which was awarded the 1983 Prix Goncourt
Sorbonne Confidential by American author Laurel Zuckerman
Tropic Moon by Belgian writer Georges Simenon

Collections
 La Bibliothèque universelle de poche (1894)
 Modern-Bibliothèque (1904)
 Le Livre populaire (1905)
 Le Livre de demain (1923-1947)
 Leçons inaugurales du Collège de France (1950)
 Voici la France (1958)
 Recherches avancées (series editor: Raymond Abellio) (1974)
 Les Enfants du fleuve (series editor: Jean-Claude Didelot) (1990)
 Pour une histoire du XXe siècle (1991)
 Histoire de la pensée (1999)
 Fayard noir (2004-2009)
 À venir (series editor: Geoffroy de Lagasnerie) (2009)

References

External links
 Official website

Book publishing companies of France
Publishing companies established in 1857
Mass media in Paris
French companies established in 1857